Erodonidae is a family of bivalves belonging to the order Myida.

Genera:
 Erodona Bosc, 1801
 †Potamomya Sowerby, 1839

References

Myida
Bivalve families